Trenta means "thirty" in some of the Romance  languages, including Italian and Catalan. It may also refer to:

Places
Italy
 Trenta, Italy, a comune in the province of Cosenza

Slovenia
 Trenta, Bovec, a settlement in the Slovenian Julian Alps
 Trenta (valley), a valley in the Slovenian Julian Alps

People
 Elisabetta Trenta, Italian politician

Other uses
 Trenta, a 31 oz. Starbucks beverage size which was introduced in 1999